Brooke Raboutou (born April 9, 2001) is an American professional rock climber. At 11, she became the youngest female to send . Raboutou also performed well on the youth climbing circuit from 2015 to 2018.

In 2019, she qualified for the Tokyo 2020 Olympics by finishing ninth in the combined Climbing World Championships.

Biography
Raboutou's parents,  and Robyn Erbesfield-Raboutou, are former world champion rock climbers. Didier is a three-time World Cup champion, and Robyn is a five-time US champion and four-time World Cup champion.

Raboutou began attending the University of San Diego in 2018, before taking time off in early 2020 to prepare for the later-postponed Tokyo Olympics. Raboutou finished in 5th place in Combined at the inaugural Sport Climbing event in the Olympic Games.

Rankings

World Cups

Season rankings

Podiums
Bouldering

Lead

Climbing World Championships 
Youth

Senior

References

External links
 
 
 
 
 

2001 births
Living people
American female climbers
American rock climbers
University of San Diego people
Sportspeople from Boulder, Colorado
Sport climbers at the 2020 Summer Olympics
Olympic sport climbers of the United States
21st-century American women
IFSC Climbing World Cup overall medalists
Boulder climbers